Non Charoen is a subdistrict municipality (thesaban tambon) in Buriram Province, Thailand. The town covers the whole subdistrict (tambon) Non Charoen of Ban Kruat district.

History
The local government unit was established effective  February 21 1997 as a subdistrict administrative organization (SAO).  On October 27 2009 it was upgraded to a subdistrict municipality.

Territory 
 Northern bordering Tambon Khao Din Nuea
 Eastern bordering Khao Din Nuea, Khok Klang Amphoe Phanom Dong Rak Surin Province
 Southern bordering Tambon Chan Thop Phet, Sai Ta Ku
 Western bordering Tambon Hin Lat

Administration divisions 
There are 11 muban (villages) in Non Charoen.

References

External links
Official Website

Populated places in Buriram province